Tom Quade (17 September 1931 – 14 June 2000) was an Australian rules footballer who played with North Melbourne in the Victorian Football League (VFL).

Notes

External links 

1931 births
2000 deaths
Australian rules footballers from New South Wales
North Melbourne Football Club players